Henry Bacon (8 October 1839 – 13 March 1912) was an American painter, author, illustrator, and translator. Before his formal training as an artist, he served as a soldier and war artist during the American Civil War, and was badly wounded in the Second Battle of Bull Run.  He then studied in France, and became a member of the Pont-Aven School, painting genre subjects of French country life, many sold back in America.  He first traveled to Egypt in 1897, and then developed an interest in Orientalist painting, soon spending his winters in the Middle East, dying in Cairo.

Life and career

Henry A. Bacon was born in Haverhill, Massachusetts in 1839. During the American Civil War, he enlisted in the Union Army on 16 July 1861 and acted as a field artist for Frank Leslie's Weekly while he served as a soldier within the 13th Massachusetts Infantry. Badly wounded at Bull Run, he was discharged on 19 December 1862.

After the war, he studied art with Walter Gay, who suggested that he travel to Paris to undertake a formal art education. In 1864, he went to Paris, with his first wife Elizabeth Lord, to study figure painting. He was admitted to the National School of Fine Arts and was one of Alexandre Cabanel's scholars. He went also to Brittany and passing through Pont-Aven, he fell in love with the place. Back in Paris, he mentioned the place to his friends painters. He is credited to have been the first painter from a long group of painters to come to Pont-Aven including Paul Gauguin. This period is known nowadays as the Pont-Aven School.

He exhibited at the salon from 1868 through to 1896 with genre works which had found favour with the American market. He also worked as a journalist sending reports of events in Paris to the Boston Daily Evening Transcript. In 1897, he travelled to Egypt for the first time and began regularly spending winters there. At that time, he switched from oils to watercolours which he believed was the optimal medium to capture the transparent light of the Middle East.

Bacon was the author of A Parisian Year (1882), which he also illustrated, and Parisian Art and Artists (1883). He contributed illustrations to Our Houseboat on the Nile (1901) by Lee Bacon. From 1890 to 1898, he translated from the French annual volumes about the Paris Salon with illustrations by Goupil & Cie.

Bacon died of a heart attack in Cairo, Egypt, in 1912.

Gallery

Bibliography

A bibliography of books written by, illustrated by, or translated by Henry Bacon:

Author
 Bacon, Henry (1882). A Parisian Year, illustrated by the author, Boston: Roberts Brothers, 1882. 
 Bacon, Henry (1883). Parisian Art and Artists, Boston: J.R. Osgood and Company, 1883.

Illustrator
 Bacon, Lee (1901). Our Houseboat on the Nile, with illustrations from water colors by Henry Bacon, Boston: Houghton, Mifflin and Company, 1901.

Translator (chronological)
 Dayot, Armand (1890). The Salon of 1890, with text in English, translated by Henry Bacon, Boston: Estes & Lauriat, 1890.
 Proust, Antonin (1891). The Salon of 1891 with text in English, translated by Henry Bacon, Boston: Estes & Lauriat, 1891.
 Larroumet, Gustave (1892). The Salon of 1892, with text in English, translated by Henry Bacon. New York: Boussad, Valadon & Co., 1892.
 Jollivet, Gaston (1893). Goupil's Paris Salon 1893 with text in English, translated by Henry Bacon. New York: Boussad, Valadon & Co., 1893.
 Milès, Roger (1894). Goupil's Paris Salon of 1894 with text in English, translated by Henry Bacon, New York: Boussad, Valadon & Co., 1894.
 Bénédite, Léonce (1895). Goupil's Paris Salon of 1895 with text in English, translated by Henry Bacon, New York: Boussod, Valadon & Co., 1895.
 Thiébault-Sisson (1896). Goupil's Paris Salon of 1896 with text in English, translated by Henry Bacon, New York: Jean Boussad, Mansi, Jouant & Co., 1896. 
 Schefer, Gaston (1897). Goupil's Paris Salon of 1897 with text in English, translated by Henry Bacon, New York: Jean Boussad, Mansi, Jouant & Co., 1897.
 Proust, Antonin (1898). Goupil's Paris Salon of 1898 with text in English, translated by Henry Bacon, New York: Jean Boussad, Mansi, Jouant & Co., 1898.

References

Sources

External links
 
 A finding aid to the Henry Bacon papers, 1849-1931 in the Archives of American Art, Smithsonian Institution
 Henry Bacon at American Art Gallery

1839 births
1912 deaths
19th-century American painters
20th-century American painters
American male painters
American alumni of the École des Beaux-Arts
Orientalist painters
Pont-Aven painters
19th-century American male artists
20th-century American male artists